Ina Savenka (born 5 August 1994) is a Belarusian professional racing cyclist, who most recently rode for UCI Women's Continental Team . She rode at the 2015 UCI Track Cycling World Championships.

Major results

Track

2012 
 3rd Team pursuit, National Track Championships
2014
 Grand Prix Minsk
1st Points race
1st Scratch
3rd Omnium
 UEC Under-23 European Track Championships
2nd  Omnium
2nd  Team pursuit (with Volha Masiukovich, Palina Pivavarava and Marina Shmayankova)
2015
 UEC Under-23 European Track Championships
1st  Team pursuit (with Katsiaryna Piatrouskaya, Palina Pivavarava and Marina Shmayankova)
2nd  Points race
 1st Points race, Grand Prix Minsk
 3rd  Team pursuit, UEC European Track Championships (with Katsiaryna Piatrouskaya, Palina Pivavarava and Marina Shmayankova)
2016
 1st Scratch, Grand Prix Minsk
 UEC Under-23 European Track Championships
2nd  Omnium
3rd  Individual pursuit
2017
 National Track Championships
1st  Team pursuit
1st  Omnium
1st  Individual pursuit
2nd Points race
3rd Scratch
 3rd Points race, International Track Race Panevežys
2018
 National Track Championships
1st  Individual pursuit
3rd Scratch
 2nd  Points race, UEC European Track Championships
2019
 National Track Championships
1st  Omnium
1st  Team pursuit
1st  Madison
1st  Team sprint
3rd Individual pursuit
3rd Points race
2020
 National Track Championships
1st  Points race
2nd Individual pursuit
2nd Madison (with Karalina Savenka)
2nd Team pursuit
3rd Omnium
2021
 National Track Championships
1st  Scratch
2nd Individual pursuit
2nd Team pursuit
2nd Madison

Road
Source: 

2014
 5th Road race, National Road Championships
2015
 3rd Road race, National Road Championships
2016
 National Road Championships
4th Road race
5th Time trial
 9th VR Women ITT
2017
 National Road Championships
2nd Time trial
3rd Road race
 7th VR Women ITT
2018
 2nd Time trial, National Road Championships
 10th Overall Panorama Guizhou International Women's Road Cycling Race
2019
 1st Grand Prix Gazipaşa
 2nd Kyivska Sotka Women Challenge
 10th Overall Tour of Uppsala
2020
 2nd Time trial, National Road Championships
2021
 10th Grand Prix Mediterrennean WE

References

External links

1994 births
Living people
Belarusian female cyclists
Place of birth missing (living people)
European Games competitors for Belarus
Cyclists at the 2019 European Games
21st-century Belarusian women